Alexandrovka is a rural locality (a settlement) in Chernavsky Selsoviet, Zavyalovsky District, Altai Krai, Russia. The population was 231 as of 2013. There are 3 streets.

Geography 
Alexandrovka is located on the Kulunda plain, 39 km southwest of Zavyalovo (the district's administrative centre) by road. Chernavka and Kamyshenka are the nearest rural localities.

References 

Rural localities in Zavyalovsky District, Altai Krai